Feels Like Summer may refer to:
 "Feels Like Summer" (Childish Gambino song), 2018
 "Feels Like Summer" (Weezer song), 2017
 "Feels Like Summer", a song by Tim Wheeler from the film Shaun the Sheep Movie
 "Feels Like Summer", a song by Vince Staples from the 2016 album FM!

See also
 "(Feels Like a) Summer's Night", a 1978 single by Ol' 55